The Blackwell School was a segregrated school in Marfa, Texas, that served the city's Hispanic population from its construction in 1909 until the end of school segration in 1965. On October 17, 2022, President Joe Biden signed legislation authorizing the establishment of Blackwell School National Historic Site as a unit of the National Park Service upon federal acquisition of the property. The site memorializes the history of supposedly "separate but equal" practices in Texas and elsewhere, as well as the role of education in Mexican American culture and the Marfa community.

The main schoolhouse building is made of adobe and has three rooms. The site also includes the Band Hall, built in 1927 as an additional classroom; other buildings have since been torn down. Originally called the Ward or Mexican School, in 1940 it was named after the principal Jesse Blackwell. At that time the school had grown to more than 600 students. After 1954, students were not permitted to speak Spanish; one former student recounted holding a mock funeral for the language. Although segregation was not required by state law, many Texas school districts practiced it until more than a decade after the Brown v. Board of Education decision. 

Alumni formed the Blackwell School Alliance to preserve the school in 2006 when the Marfa Independent School District proposed demolishing it. Their efforts led to the school's listing on the National Register of Historic Places in 2019. The Alliance will continue to maintain the school until the National Park Service acquires sufficient land from the district. The national historic site will be the second area in the National Park System specifically about Hispanic American history, after César E. Chávez National Monument.

See also 

National Register of Historic Places listings in Presidio County, Texas
Hispanic Heritage Site
Brown v. Board of Education National Historical Park

References

External links 

Official Site – National Park Service
NPS Places – Blackwell School
Blackwell School Alliance

National Register of Historic Places in Presidio County, Texas
School buildings on the National Register of Historic Places in Texas
Marfa, Texas
Segregated schools in the United States
School buildings completed in 1909